Coups d'état in Venezuela have occurred almost since the foundation of the Republic. Throughout the history of Venezuela, insurrections, uprisings, or military or civil revolutions were used to overthrow and replace governments. These coups were performed using force, intimidation, and pseudo-legal methods. Gradually with the consolidation of a democratic system in the country, coups became less and less common.

The first uprising in Venezuela took place in 1835 against the government of José María Vargas, by the conservative Congress and José Antonio Páez. The most recent was the one that took place on April 11, 2002, which caused the brief overthrow of Hugo Chávez and the installation of a de facto government by Pedro Carmona Estanga.

List of coups

1908 coup d'état 

The coup d'état of December 19, 1908, was a movement led by General Juan Vicente Gómez in Venezuela, by means of which, in the absence of President Cipriano Castro, he took power and would govern dictatorially, either directly by being elected by the president congress or indirectly through civilian puppet governments that obeyed him.

Pleading a conspiracy to assassinate him, Gómez staged the December 1908 coup, leading a brutal dictatorship until his death in 1935.

October 1945 coup d'état 

Known by its supporters as the "October Revolution", it was a coup in Venezuela against the government of the president of the republic, Isaías Medina Angarita, carried out by a coalition of the Armed Forces and the Democratic Action political party, resulting in the arrival to the power of Rómulo Betancourt. One of the most controversial aspects of the events of 1945 was the title of "Revolution" with which the members of Democratic Action baptized what was nothing more than a civic-military coup d'état, whose main leaders were Rómulo Betancourt and Marcos Pérez Jiménez.

1948 coup d'état 

The coup d'état of November 24, 1948 was an insurrection of soldiers and politicians against the democratically elected Venezuelan president Rómulo Gallegos who was overthrown and forced into exile, in his place a Military Junta was installed, chaired by Carlos Delgado Chalbaud, and integrated also by lieutenant colonels Marcos Pérez Jiménez and Luis Felipe Llovera Páez, the military junta after the assassination of Delgado Chalbaud in 1950, he would appoint Germán Suárez Flamerich, who would govern until the results of the 1952 elections were ignored, by Pérez Jiménez who, being part of the Junta, declared himself the winner of the elections and began a dictatorship that would be overthrown in 1958.

January 1958 coup d'état 

The Coup d'etat of January 23, 1958, also known as the Civic-Military Governing Board of 1958 or the Overthrow of General Marcos Pérez Jiménez, was a historical event that occurred in Venezuela, through which the dictatorship of General Marcos Pérez Jiménez, who was forced to leave the country for the Dominican Republic aboard the presidential plane "La Vaca Sagrada". Pérez Jiménez had been holding the position of president of Venezuela since the early 1950s, with the end of his regime the democratic process began in Venezuela, although before that date there had already been some short experiences or democratic trials such as those of 1947.

1992 first coup d'état attempt 

On February 4, 1992, a group of soldiers carried out an attempted coup in Venezuela against the then constitutional president Carlos Andrés Pérez. The attempt did not achieve its objectives and the rebels surrendered. Among the raised officers who commanded this maneuver were, mainly, four army lieutenant colonels: Hugo Chávez, Francisco Arias Cárdenas, Yoel Acosta Chirinos and Jesús Urdaneta.

This event radically transformed Venezuelan political life, introducing new actors on the scene: of these four protagonists, the first was president from 1999 until his death in 2013; however, Arias has also dabbled in politics: he was elected governor of Zulia state, a presidential candidate in 2000, competing with his own former partner (at the time) Hugo Chávez, and again governor of Zulia in 2013 after reconciling with Chávez; Acosta has kept a low profile and Urdaneta has become a critic of the policies carried out by the Chávez government.

All the participants in this action were taken to prison for this action, their case being later dismissed and released two years later, during the presidency of Rafael Caldera.

1992 second coup d'état attempt 

On November 27, 1992, an unsuccessful coup attempt was carried out in Venezuela against the government of then President Carlos Andrés Pérez, just nine months after another attempt in February of the same year. On this occasion, civilians and military participated in the coup. The most prominent names in this attempt were Hernán Grüber Odremán, Luis Enrique Cabrera Aguirre, Francisco Visconti Osorio, and the Bandera Roja and Tercer Camino political parties.

April 2002 coup d'état 

A general civic strike lasting more than 3 days, called by union and business organizations opposed to the Government, was carried out throughout the country, in response to the deteriorating economic situation in the country; in which there were international reserves of 10 billion dollars, a cut in public spending by 22% and a devaluation of the currency by 20%, plus the removal of the President of the state oil company PDVSA by Hugo Chávez and the a call by Pedro Luis Soto, Colonel of Aviation, to the Armed Forces to "save democracy that is being threatened by Hugo Chávez"; were the antecedents prior to the coup d'état. Similarly, the savage repression by state security forces of a peaceful gathering of nearly 1 million people in the Chuao de Caracas urbanization served as a trigger, as well as the arbitrary imprisonment of some military and civilian leaders who issued a speech before these citizens who were demonstrating, at the same time that then President Chávez fired more than 16,000 workers from the state oil company PDVSA through a national media network.

Trade union and business organizations call for a mass rally for April 11, 2002. This rally turned into a march that traveled the 11 kilometers that separated the site of the call and the Presidential Palace. In the afternoon, once near the seat of government, clashes broke out between members of the Caracas Metropolitan Police, who were guarding the opposition march, and supporters of the President. Leaving a balance of 19 dead. The Government immediately accused the opposition of having taken the march without permission to the Miraflores Palace where there were supporters of the ruling party supporting the Government. While on the other hand those who led the opposition march accused the government of having planned the violent actions.

The President orders the activation of Plan Ávila to control the situation, but this order is ignored by military commanders who demand the president's resignation. Minutes after the order, President Chávez called for calm in the population on a national radio and television channel; For their part, the private media decided to divide the screen, an action considered by them as an act of journalistic response to the events. While on one screen the President was seen in total calm, on the second screen the chaos caused by the shootings that occurred in Caracas was shown.

In the evening hours of the same April 11, the Minister of Defense, General in Chief Lucas Rincón, announced the request and subsequent acceptance of the resignation of President Hugo Chávez. In the early hours of April 12 at the Miraflores Palace, Hugo Chávez surrenders to the insurgent military and is fired by his ministers and other Palace workers; then he is taken to military installations located in Caracas. A few minutes after Chávez's arrest, Pedro Carmona Estanga announces to the country on national television that President Chávez has resigned, and that the military have asked him to lead a Provisional Government until free elections where the new Government is elected. Constitutional. However, President Chávez later stated that he never signed his resignation and that he was kidnapped.

On the afternoon of the 12th, the president of the federation of business associations, Pedro Carmona Estanga, supported by the insurgent military and various sectors of civil society, assumes the Presidency of the Republic through a controversial and illegal decree that dismissed all executive officials that made up the national public powers (TSJ, CNE, National Assembly of Venezuela, Prosecutor's Office, Ombudsman, Comptroller's Office, Ministries) and local (mayors, governors, deputies to municipal and state parliaments) from their positions and also allowed the Provisional Government appoint the new members of all the previous positions; It also changed the name of the country from "Bolivarian Republic of Venezuela" to "Republic of Venezuela" and committed the Provisional Government to convene free, secret and universal general elections for all elected positions and also promised to hand over power to the new Government. Constitutional Court resulting from said elections and to be accountable to it. The decree was called the Act of Constitution of the Government of Democratic Transition and National Unity, which was signed by 400 people who were present at the Miraflores Palace, and supported more by the insurgent military.

On the morning of April 13, the political police, following orders from the Provisional Government, persecuted the representatives of the ousted government to make them pay before the Venezuelan justice system and protected a group of demonstrators who were attacking the Cuban Embassy in Caracas (this due to that the police could not in any way break into any embassy of another country, but they also did not break up the protesters who attacked it).

That same day an operation is launched to restore constitutional order. The then attorney general of the Republic, Isaías Rodríguez, declares that a coup d'état has occurred since, among other things, there is no physical evidence of his resignation, however the national television stations take it off the air. Relatives of Hugo Chávez denounced the situation before international media. On the 13th, Raúl Baduel, Chief of the Army Garrison of the city of Maracay, 100 kilometers from the capital, ignores the new government and contacts the military loyal to Hugo Chávez. Supporters of the deposed President hold demonstrations in Caracas demanding his return. The Miraflores Palace was taken over by troops loyal to Chavez. This, who had been transferred from one military installation to another (located on La Orchila Island) during the last 48 hours, is rescued and taken back to Caracas, where he again assumes command.

About 8 months later, the Supreme Court of Justice of Venezuela ruled that what happened was not a "coup d'état" but a "power vacuum", based on what was previously affirmed by the highest military authority in the country, General-in-Chief Lucas Rincón Romero, affected by the Chávez government. For this reason, the masterminds of said military uprising were not imprisoned or sentenced, nor were the civilians who supported it, except for those cases in which the commission of common crimes against officials of the temporarily deposed government or against public property or private.

See also 
 Venezuelan civil wars
 Caracazo
 History of Venezuela
 Politics of Venezuela
 Elections in Venezuela

References 

History of Venezuela
History of Venezuela by topic
Military coups in Venezuela
19th century in Venezuela